Cinema 16 was a New York City–based film society founded by Amos Vogel. From 1947-63, he and his wife, Marcia, ran the most successful and influential membership film society in North American history, at its height boasting 7000 members.

History
Vogel was inspired by Maya Deren's independent exhibitions. Deren exhibited and presented lectures on her films across the United States, Cuba and Canada. In 1946, she booked the Provincetown Playhouse in Greenwich Village for a public exhibition titled Three Abandoned Films, which consisted of showings of Meshes of the Afternoon, At Land, and A Study in Choreography for the Camera. Deren took the word "abandoned" to refer to Paul Valéry's observation that a work of art is never completed, just abandoned. While the title was ironic, the exhibition was successful.

Cinema 16 closed in 1963, after 17 years in operation. In that year Amos went on to programme the New York Film Festival. Grove Press acquired Cinema 16 in 1966.

Programming

The movies shown at Cinema 16 consisted mostly of the experimental film that began flourishing after World War II, as well as nonfiction films – not only documentaries, but educational films as well. In that, it differed even from the narrative-oriented art cinemas that appeared in the postwar years.

Filmmakers exhibited
 Jonas Mekas
 Maya Deren
 Gregory Markopoulos
 Ron Peterson
 Carmen D'Avino (one of his films, the 1963 Oscar-nominated animated short Pianissimo, was distributed by Cinema 16)
Stan Brakhage
Shirley Clarke
Bruce Conner
Joseph Cornell
Brian De Palma
Georges Franju
Richard Lester
Nagisa Oshima
Yasujiro Ozu
Roman Polanski
Alain Resnais
Jacques Rivette
Carlos Saura 
François Truffaut
Agnès Varda
John Cassavetes

References

Further reading
 MacDonald, Scott (2002). Cinema 16: Documents Toward a History of the Film Society. Philadelphia: Temple University Press. .

1947 establishments in New York City
1963 disestablishments in New York (state)
Cinema of New York City
American artist groups and collectives
Filmmaker cooperatives
Film societies
Experimental film
Organizations based in New York City
Organizations disestablished in 1963
Organizations established in 1947